The Rali Vinho da Madeira is a tarmac rally held in Madeira Island, Portugal, and it is the biggest annual sporting event of the island, bringing thousands of people into the roads to watch the drivers compete through the hilly terrain and the natural landscapes. Its first edition was in 1959, having later entered the European Rally Championship in 1979, and remained in its calendar until 2012. It has also been part of the Intercontinental Rally Challenge since the championship was first held in 2006, which brought further exposure to the event as Eurosport broadcasts footage of this championship to many countries.

The rally is traditionally run in the summer, in early August or late July. The stages of Chão da Lagoa, Paul da Serra and the Encumeada downhill are known as its biggest driving challenges. Several drivers of international note such as Ari Vatanen, Henri Toivonen, Massimo Biasion and Andrea Aghini have won this rally before going on to win World Rally Championship rounds and championships. Aghini is the most successful driver in the events history, winning four times between 1992 and 2002. In 2013 Giandomenico Basso became the second driver to achieve a fourth victory, the same happened in 2015 with Bruno Magalhães.

The event is named after the Madeira wine.

Winners

References

External links
Official website
Rallybase
Youtube - onboard video of the Encumeada stage

 
Madeira
Vinho
Vinho